Adam Frączczak (born 7 August 1987 in Kołobrzeg) is a Polish professional footballer who plays as a striker for Polish club Kotwica Kołobrzeg.

Career

Club
In January 2011, he joined Pogoń Szczecin on one and a half year contract.

Career statistics

Club

1 Including Ekstraklasa Cup.

References

External links
 
 

1987 births
Living people
Polish footballers
Ekstraklasa players
I liga players
III liga players
Legia Warsaw II players
Legia Warsaw players
Kotwica Kołobrzeg footballers
Ząbkovia Ząbki players
Pogoń Szczecin players
Korona Kielce players
People from Kołobrzeg
Sportspeople from West Pomeranian Voivodeship
Association football forwards